Peter George Bush  (born 16 October 1930) is a New Zealand photographer and photojournalist, best known as the country's leading sports photographer. He has also served as a war correspondent, and is the long-serving vice president of the National Press Club.

Born on 16 October 1930, Bush was educated at Sacred Heart College, Auckland. His sports journalism career began in 1949, when he photographed his first rugby union test match for The New Zealand Herald. Since then he has photographed most All Black matches in a career that has spanned over 60 years. A major exhibition of his sixty-year career of rugby photographs, "Hard on the heels", toured thirteen centres in New Zealand in 2010–11.

In the 1991 New Year Honours, Bush was awarded the Queen's Service Medal for public services. In the 2011 New Year Honours, he was appointed a Companion of the New Zealand Order of Merit, for services to photography. He lives in and works from Island Bay in Wellington.

He is a nephew of 1931 All Black Ronald Bush.

Biography
A Life in Focus, by Paul Thomas and Peter Bush, (2009, Hodder Moa)

References

External links
Stace, Lee (2010) "Have camera, will travel — life of our top rugby photographer". newswire.co.nz, 27 May 2010. Retrieved 9 January 2011.
Romanos, Joseph (2009) "The Wellingtonian Interview: Peter Bush" The Dominion Post, 4 April 2009. Retrieved 10 January 2011.

1931 births
Living people
People educated at Sacred Heart College, Auckland
New Zealand photojournalists
Rugby union people in New Zealand
Sports photographers
Companions of the New Zealand Order of Merit
Recipients of the Queen's Service Medal
Photographers from Auckland